Rhinobatos annandalei, or Annandale's guitarfish, is a type of ray. It is found in the Indian ocean around India, Pakistan, Sri Lanka and possibly the Persian Gulf. It is predominantly found in the marine waters, but also enters the brackish waters and freshwater rivers as well. It reaches a length of approximately 56 cm. They are ovoviviparous fishes.

References

External Links 
 WoRMS - World Register of Marine Species - Rhinobatos annandalei Norman, 1926
 ITIS - Report: Rhinobatos annandalei (Norman, 1926)
 Rhinobatos annandalei Norman, 1926 | Indiabiodiversity - Species

Rhinobatos
Fish of South Asia
Fish of the Indian Ocean
Fish described in 1926